Ulf Karl Åke Hasseltorp (born 28 September 1960 in Stockholm) is a Swedish actor, well known for his role as Hampus in the 1973 TV series Den vita stenen.

Selected filmography
 Maria (1975)

References

External links
http://wwwc.aftonbladet.se/noje/9912/22/stenen.html

Swedish Film Database

Swedish male child actors
1960 births
Living people
Male actors from Stockholm